Hugo Carvana de Hollanda (4 June 1937 – 4 October 2014) was a Brazilian actor and film director. He appeared in more than 110 films and television shows between 1954 and 2014.

Selected filmography

Film 

1955: Trabalhou Bem, Genival
1956: O Contrabando
1957: Tudo é Música
1962: Os Cafajestes .... Photographer
1962: Esse Rio Que Eu Amo .... (segment "Noite de Almirante")
1964: Os Fuzis .... José
1965: A Falecida
1966: O Desafio .... Journalist
1966: A Grande Cidade ou As Aventuras e Desventuras de Luzia e Seus 3 Amigos Chegados de Longe .... Pereba
1967: Entranced Earth .... Alvaro
1968: O Homem Que Comprou o Mundo
1968: O Engano .... Husband
1968: O Bravo Guerreiro .... Union Hanger-On
1968: A Vida Provisória .... Pedro
1968: Antes, o Verão .... The Man
1969: Antonio das Mortes .... Mattos, the Police Officer
1969: Um Sonho de Vampiros .... (voice)
1969: Um Homem e Sua Jaula
1969: Tempo de Violência
1969: Pedro Diabo Ama Rosa Meia Noite
1969: O Anjo Nasceu .... Santamaria
1969: Macunaíma .... Man with the duck
1969: Como Vai, Vai Bem?
1970: Os Herdeiros .... Maia
1970: Pindorama .... Governor
1970: The Seven Headed Lion .... Portuguese
1970: Jardim de Guerra
1971: Procura-se Uma Virgem
1971: O Rei dos Milagres
1971: Matei Por Amor
1971: Capitão Bandeira Contra o Dr. Moura Brasil .... Dr.Gestaile
1972: Quando o Carnaval Chegar .... Lourival
1972: Câncer
1973: All Nudity Shall Be Punished .... Comissário / Commissioner
1973: Tati .... Capitão Peixoto
1973: Vai Trabalhar Vagabundo .... Secundino Meireles
1973: Amor, Carnaval e Sonhos
1975: Ipanema, Adeus .... Carlos
1976: Un animal doué de déraison .... Hugo
1976: Gordos e Magros
1977: Tenda dos Milagres .... Fausto Pena
1977: Anchieta, José do Brasil
1977: A Queda .... José
1978: Se Segura, Malandro! .... Paulo Otávio
1978: Mar de Rosas .... Sérgio
1983: Bar Esperança .... Zeca
1984: Águia na Cabeça
1984: Bete Balanço .... Tony
1985: Avaete, Seed of Revenge .... Ramiro
1987: Leila Diniz .... Clyde
1990: Boca de Ouro
1990: Assim na Tela Como no Céu
1991: Vai Trabalhar, Vagabundo II - A Volta .... Dino
1997: O Homem Nu .... Taxi Driver
1999: Mauá - O Imperador e o Rei .... Queiroz
2001: Sonhos Tropicais .... Macedo
2002: Lara .... Ator Premiado
2003: God Is Brazilian .... Quincas Batalha
2003: Apolônio Brasil, Campeão da Alegria .... The Beggar
2005: Mais Uma Vez Amor .... Dr. Alvarez
2006: The Greatest Love of All .... Salvador
2007: Achados e Perdidos .... Juiz
2008: Casa da Mãe Joana .... Salomão
2009: Histórias de Amor Duram Apenas 90 Minutos .... Motorista de táxi
2010: 5x Favela, Agora por Nós Mesmos .... Dos Santos
2011: Não Se Preocupe, Nada Vai Dar Certo .... Zimba
2013: Giovanni Improtta .... Cantagallo
2014: Rio, I Love You .... Manoel (segment "Dona Fulana")

Television 

1975: Cuca Legal .... Celso Maranhão (Jacaré)
1975: Gabriela .... Argileu Palmeira
1979: Plantão de Polícia .... Valdomiro Pena
1982: Quem Ama Não Mata (TV Mini-Series) .... Fonseca
1984: Corpo a Corpo .... Alfredo Fraga Dantas
1985: De Quina pra Lua .... Silva
1986: Roda de Fogo .... Paulo Costa
1990: Gente Fina .... Guilherme Azevedo Paiva
1991: O Dono do Mundo .... Lucas
1992: As Noivas de Copacabana (TV Mini-Series) .... delegado Adroaldo de Lima
1992: De Corpo e Alma .... Agenor Pinheiro
1993: Agosto (TV Mini-Series) .... Luiz Magalhães
1993: Fera Ferida .... Numa Pompílio de Castro
1995: Engraçadinha, seus amores e seus pecados (TV Mini-Series) .... irmão Fidélis
1995: Cara e Coroa .... Aníbal
1998: Corpo Dourado .... Azevedo
1999: Chiquinha Gonzaga (TV Mini-Series) .... Gouveia
1999: O Belo e as Feras .... barman
1999: Andando nas Nuvens .... Wagner Maciera
2001: Um Anjo Caiu do Céu .... Garcia
2001: Porto dos Milagres .... dr. Gouveia
2002: Desejos de Mulher .... Atílio
2003: Celebridade .... Lineu Vasconcelos
2004: Como uma Onda .... Sinésio
2006: JK (TV Mini-Series) .... Sampaio
2007: Paraíso Tropical .... Belisário Cavalcanti
2008: Casos e Acasos .... Álvaro
2008: Malhação .... Paulo Lopret
2008: Guerra e Paz .... Moreira
2008: Três Irmãs .... Dr. Andrade
2009: Malhação .... Inspetor Ubiracy Cansado
2010: Na Forma da Lei .... Jorginho Monteverde
2011: Insensato Coração .... Olegário Silveira (Seu Silveira)
2012: O Brado Retumbante .... Mourão

References

External links

1937 births
2014 deaths
Male actors from Rio de Janeiro (city)
Brazilian male film actors
Brazilian male television actors
20th-century Brazilian male actors
21st-century Brazilian male actors